Capricorn Seamount is a seamount in Tonga. It appears to be a submerged volcano of Miocene age that may be part of a volcanic chain with Niue. Capricorn Seamount is located on the eastern flank of the Tonga Trench and is in the process of breaking up; in turn the trench has been altered by the interaction with the downgoing seamount.

Geography, research history and name 

First examined by the  during the Capricorn Expedition of the Scripps Institution of Oceanography, it was successfully dredged in 1958 by the  during the Pacific Cruise of the New Zealand Oceanographic Institute. It is also known as Capricorn guyot, Gora Kaprikorn and Capricorn tablemount.

Geomorphology and geology 

A north-northeast trending scarp separates the flat top from another, shallower flat-topped knoll on the eastern side of the flat top which also tilts westwards; the shallowest point of the seamount lies on this knoll. Additional volcanic cones dot the slopes of Capricorn Seamount. The crust underneath the seamount is 75-95 million years old and is thickened, perhaps by the seamount's lava flows.

A cap of limestones lies on Capricorn Seamount; its thickness is unknown. Dredging has yielded pelagic ooze containing abyssal clay, basaltic breccia, dark pumice, dead corals, fecal pellets, fossils of foraminifera, gastropods and pteropods, limestones with brown manganese dioxide encrustations, otoliths and sand. The foraminifera are of recent to Plio-Pleistocene age and the limestones formed in shallow water.

Fisheries 

Albacore, bigeye and yellowfin aggregate at the seamount, and fishing catch rates are much higher than in the open ocean. The seamount has been used for fishing for a long time.

Origin, geologic history and present-day interaction with the Tonga Trench 

Capricorn Seamount likely formed in the Miocene (23-5 million years ago) as a volcano, perhaps part of a hotspot track which also includes Niue. The volcano was later eroded until it received a flat summit surface, and eventually submerged. It is unclear whether it ever featured coral reefs as no evidence of such growth has been found although foraminifera data point to their past existence.

The seamount is about to enter the Tonga Trench and is breaking up in the process. It appears that the collision of the seamount with the trench has caused the formation of a fault linked to the "Fonualei discontinuity". The tilting of the summit platform was the first evidence of the existence of subduction processes. In about 500,000 years the top of the seamount will end up at the bottom of the trench. Capricorn Seamount is not the first seamount there to be subducted into the Tonga Trench, and previous subduction events may have deformed the trench. An earthquake occurred in 1919 at the trench next to Capricorn Seamount and caused a tsunami; it might also have induced a submarine landslide on the seamount. Earthquakes occur underneath Capricorn Seamount where normal faults are apparent in the seafloor.

References

Sources 

 
 
 
 
 
 

Miocene volcanoes
Seamounts of the Pacific Ocean
Tonga